Baloğlu can refer to:

 Baloğlu, Kulp
 Baloğlu, Refahiye